Two partial lunar eclipses occurred in 1970: 

 21 February 1970 lunar eclipse
 17 August 1970 lunar eclipse

See also 
 List of 20th-century lunar eclipses
 Lists of lunar eclipses